Michael Takyi-Frimpong (born October 11) known by the stage name Lord Paper is a Ghanaian soul, afrobeats and hip hop musician. He is best known for his 2016 single "Awurama".

Early life 
Lord Paper was born in Accra but hail from Mampong, a suburb of Mampong Municipal District, a town in the Ashanti Region. He completed his senior high school education at Swedru Secondary School in the year 2008 and attended University of Ghana in 2013 for his undergraduate degree.

Music career 
He entered the music scene 2010 after leaving his job as an actor in South Africa to pursue full-time music in Ghana (2014)). He became famous when he released his debut controversial single and video Awurama in 2016.
The song has been criticised over the sexually explicit content of the music video.

Discography 

Singles

Awards and nominations

Vodafone Ghana Music Awards

MTN 4Syte Music Video Awards

References

External links
Lord Paper on SoundCloud

Living people
21st-century Ghanaian male singers
21st-century Ghanaian singers
1989 births
Musicians from Accra
University of Ghana alumni